Enrique Lamadrid (born December 12, 1942) is an American historian in the US state of New Mexico, known for his studies of Chicano, Mexican American, and Hispano culture. He is Professor Emeritus for the Department of Spanish and Portuguese at University of New Mexico. He has worked for the Smithsonian Institution, Museum of New Mexico, and the National Hispanic Cultural Center. He has written books in both English and Spanish.

Bibliography

Spanish translations

References

1942 births
Living people
20th-century American historians
21st-century American historians
Historians from New Mexico